Tamás Cseh (22 January 1943 in Budapest – 7 August 2009 in Budapest) was a Hungarian composer, singer and actor. He won the Kossuth Prize and also the Liszt Ferenc prize.

From 1967 to 1974 he taught art at a primary school in Budapest. From 1970 he worked together with Géza Bereményi, composing several popular songs.

Discography 
 Levél nővéremnek (1977, with János Másik)
 Antoine és Désiré (1978)
 Fehér babák takarodója (1979)
 Műcsarnok (1981)
 Frontátvonulás (1983)
 Jóslat (1984)
 Utóirat (1987)
 Mélyrepülés (1988)
 Vasárnapi nép (1989, live album)
 Cseh Tamás - Bereményi Géza válogatáslemez (1990)
 Új dalok (1990)
 Nyugati pályaudvar (1993)
 Levél nővéremnek 2. (1994, with János Másik) 
 A telihold dalai (1997)
 Jóslat a Metrón (2003, live)
 A véletlen szavai (2004)
 Az igazi levél nővéremnek (2004, with János Másik)
 Esszencia (2007, compilation)
 Ózdi koncert '96 (2008)
 A DAL nélkül... (2009)

Sources 
 
 Tamás Cseh's official webpage
 Tamás Cseh Museum of Sándor Petőfi
 

1943 births
2009 deaths
Hungarian male composers
20th-century Hungarian male singers
Hungarian male actors
Recipients of the Kossuth Prize
Burials at Farkasréti Cemetery